The murder of Lasa and Zabala was one of the first acts carried out by the GAL, a state sponsored death squad, Basques José Antonio Lasa and José Ignacio Zabala were kidnapped, tortured and executed in 1983.

This action was organized by a paramilitary group called GAL which subsequent trials found to have been established by figures within the PSOE government. Alleged ETA militants Joxean Lasa and Joxi Zabala, while getting into a friend's car, were kidnapped by non-uniformed members of the Spanish police in Bayonne (Labourd-French Basque Country). They were secretly taken to San Sebastián, and locked up in a house property of the government always in Spanish Police's (Guardia Civil) hands. For a long time, these two men from the municipality of Tolosa, were interrogated under severe conditions The organizers of the operation, provided they complied with the objectives of extracting information, ordered the murder of Lasa and Zabala. In order to accomplish this, the hostages were transferred to Alicante. There, they were forced to dig their own graves, and then, they were shot dead. Finally, the executors covered the dead bodies with quicklime to accelerate their decomposition, and eliminate or minimize any evidence of the crime.

Trial and Sentence 

Enrique Rodríguez Galindo, General of the Guardia Civil (Spanish Police) stationed in Inchaurrondo, Angel Vaquero, lieutenant colonel in the same barracks, and Julen Elgorriaga the then civil governor of Gipuzkoa were found guilty. In total they were sentenced to 365 years in prison, but after serving some years in prison (5 in the case of General Galindo) were eventually granted a pardon by the government.

In popular culture 

Pablo Malo directed the 2014 film Lasa eta Zabala about this case.

References 

Terrorism deaths
Terrorist incidents in France in 1983
Grupos Antiterroristas de Liberación
Extrajudicial killings
Enforced disappearances
1983 murders in Spain
Cross-border operations
Kidnappings in France